Bozieni may refer to several places in Romania:

Bozieni, Neamț, a commune in Neamț County
Bozieni, a village administered by Săveni town, Botoșani County
Bozieni, a village in Fântânele Commune, Prahova County
Bozienii de Sus, a village in Ruginoasa Commune, Neamț County
Bozieni (river), a tributary of the Bârlad in Neamț County

and to:

Bozieni, Hîncești, a commune in Hîncești district, Moldova